This is a list of Norwegian literature authors in the order of their year of birth. The century assignment is the period of their most significant works.

17th century
Dorothe Engelbretsdotter (1634–1713)
Petter Dass (1647–1707)

18th century

19th century

20th century

21st century
Carl Frode Tiller (born 1970)
Ari Behn (1972–2019)
Bertrand Besigye (born 1972)
Pedro Carmona-Alvarez (born 1972)
Henrik H. Langeland (born 1972)
Tore Renberg (born 1972)
Matias Faldbakken (born 1973)
Gunnhild Øyehaug (born 1975)
Ingeborg Arvola (born 1975)
Endre Lund Eriksen (born 1977)
Mette Karlsvik (born 1978)
Johan Harstad (born 1979)
Helga Flatland (born 1984)
Karoline Brændjord (born 1990)

See also
List of Norwegian women writers

Norwegian writers

Writers